Visa requirements for Guyanese citizens are administrative entry restrictions by the authorities of other states placed on citizens of Guyana. As of 9 November 2022, Guyanese citizens have visa-free or visa-on-arrival access to 88 countries and territories, ranking the Guyanese passport 62nd in terms of travel freedom according to the Henley Passport Index.

Visa requirements map

Visa requirements

Dependent territories and disputed areas

Non-visa restrictions

See also

Guyanese passport
Visa policy of Guyana

External links
 Visa-free travel for citizens of Guyana

References and Notes
References

Notes

Guyana
Foreign relations of Guyana